The 1966–67 season was Stoke City's 60th season in the Football League and the 36th in the First Division.

England won the 1966 World Cup and one of the winners, Gordon Banks joined Stoke in April 1967 in what was a master stroke signing by Tony Waddington he also brought in Arsenal winger George Eastham. On the pitch Stoke continued to finish in mid table this time in 12th spot.

Season review

League
1966 saw Albert Henshall return to the club as chairman and England won the World Cup, two of Alf Ramsey's squad would sign for Stoke within the next twelve months. In the summer of 1966 Waddington secured the services of former Newcastle United winger George Eastham from Arsenal for £35,000. The other was goalkeeper Gordon Banks who was snapped up for a bargain £52,000 from Leicester City in April 1967. Matt Gillies, the Leicester manager was coming under considerable pressure to play his young reserve Peter Shilton and decided to sell the 29-year-old Banks to Stoke. It is widely considered that this was a 'steal' as Banks carried on to play for England for another five years. Banks left English football in 1972 and ironically Stoke signed Shilton as his replacement.

Stoke had a fine, enterprising squad in 1966–67 and they ran up some fine results, beating eventual champions Manchester United 3–0 as well as Tottenham Hotspur, Nottingham Forest, Everton and West Bromwich Albion all before October. However, with Stoke looking forward to a potentially great season the fans were shocked when John Ritchie was sold to Sheffield Wednesday for £70,000 in November 1966. Whilst Wednesday paid a lot of money for Ritchie it came as a surprise as a month before Stoke had sold unsuccessful reserve striker John Woodward to Aston Villa for £30,000. But Ritchie's departure was soon forgotten as the team battled on holding on to a mid-table position.

FA Cup
Stoke failed to make it past the third round losing by two goals to nil against Manchester United at Old Trafford.

League Cup
Walsall again proved to Stoke's cup bogey side beating Stoke 2–1 at Fellows Park.

Final league table

Results

Stoke's score comes first

Legend

Football League First Division

FA Cup

League Cup

Cleveland Stokers
Stoke were one of a number of teams exported to the USA to play in the United Soccer Association in 1967 to help promote the sport in the country. Stoke represented Cleveland, Ohio and went under the name of the Cleveland Stokers and finished 2nd in their group.

In the travelling Stoke party included the likes of Gordon Banks, Peter Dobing, George Eastham, Maurice Setters and Roy Vernon as well as manager Tony Waddington. The team started well going undefeated in their first seven matches defeating Washington Whips 2–1, Boston Rovers 1–0, San Francisco Golden Gate Gales and Dallas Tornado both 4–1. They then suffered back to back 2–1 defeats to New York Skyliners and Houston Stars before a 2–0 win over Toronto City put them back on track for a play-off place. However a goalless draw with Detroit Cougars and a 3–1 defeat in the final match against Vancouver Royals saw the Stokers miss out on a play-off spot by a single point.

Friendlies

Squad statistics

References

Stoke City F.C. seasons
Stoke